Louise Campbell may refer to:

 Louise Campbell (designer) (born 1970), Danish furniture and lighting designer
 Louise Campbell (actress) (1911–1997), American actress
 Louise Campbell, Duchess of Argyll (1904–1970)

See also
 Louis Campbell (born 1979), American basketball player